Yıldız (Turkish for 'star') may refer to:

Places in Turkey
 , a village in Diyadin district, Ağrı Province
 Yıldız, Beypazarı, a village in Ankara Province
 Yıldız, Susurluk, a village in Balıkesir Province 
 Yıldız, Bartın, a village in Bartın Province
 , a village in Adilcevaz district, Bitlis Province
 Yıldız, Beşiktaş, a neighborhood in Istanbul
 Yıldız Mountains or Strandzha, a mountain massif between Bulgaria and Turkey

Other uses
 Yıldız Palace, a palace in Istanbul
 Yıldız Park, an urban park in Istanbul
 Yıldız Clock Tower, a clock tower in Istanbul
 Yıldız Technical University, a school in Istanbul
 Yıldız Holding, a Turkish manufacturer of food products
 Yyldyz Hotel, a hotel in Ashgabat, Turkmenistan
 Yıldız, a kilim motif
 Yıldız, a Crimean Tatar magazine.

People with the name

Given name
 Yildiz Akdogan (born 1973), Turkish-born Danish politician
 Yıldız İbrahimova (born 1952), Turkish singer
 Yıldız Kaplan (born 1970), Turkish actress, fashion model and pop singer
 Yıldız Kenter (1928–2019), Turkish actress and lecturer
 Yıldız Tilbe (born 1966), Turkish singer

Surname
 Ahmet Yıldız (born 1979), Turkish scientist
 Betül Cemre Yıldız (born 1989), Turkish chess player and grand master
 Bilge Yildiz, Turkish nuclear engineer
 Dilşat Yıldız (born 1996), Turkish curler
 Esra Yıldız (born 1997), Turkish boxer
 Mehmet Yıldız (born 1981), Turkish footballer
 Rıfat Yıldız (born 1965), German wrestler of Turkish origin
 Seda Yıldız (born 1998), Turkish Paralympian goalball player
 Taner Yıldız (born 1962), Turkish politician
 Taner Yıldız (footballer) (born 1992), Turkish footballer
 Yakup Yıldız (born 2003), Turkish archer
 Yaser Yıldız (born 1988), Turkish footballer

See also
 Yıldız assassination attempt, an attempt on Ottoman Sultan Abdul Hamid II
 Yıldız Hamidiye Mosque, a mosque in Yıldız, Istanbul

Turkish-language surnames
Turkish unisex given names